Raguf Orujov  (12 July 1972, Agdam District, Azerbaijan – 2 April 2016, Ganja, Azerbaijan) was a lieutenant colonel of the Azerbaijani Armed Forces who fought in the First Nagorno-Karabakh War, and later the 2016 Nagorno-Karabakh clashes where he was killed. He was posthumously awarded the "For heroism" Medal.

Early life and education 
Raguf Orujov was born on 12 July 1972 in Dzhinli village of Agdam District to the family of Raya and Ibrahim Orujovs. He was the firstborn of the family and had three brothers and one sister. He served in the Soviet Army in the 1990s, later left the army and joined the ranks of the Azerbaijani Armed Forces. Once, Raguf got heavy injuries in the military operations. He suffered a heavy debris injury during four months of his military operations in the village of Aranzami. At that time, his uncle Azer Rahimov was killed as a result of Armenians firing Agdam District.

On June 12, 1993, the Armenian army attacked the Dzhinli village of Agdam District. Despite the fightings between Azerbaijani and Armenian sides, Armenian forces occupied the territory of the Dzhinli village. As a result of the occupation, his mother was killed in their native village by Armenian soldiers.

In the same year, Raguf Orujov applied to the Baku High Infantry Commanders School, but was not admitted. Nevertheless, he did not lose his enthusiasm and applied to the same school the following year and was admitted to the school of Azerbaijani Armed Forces.

Family background 
Raguf Orujov married Sevinj Alizadeh in 1999. The Orujovs had two sons, Agshin and Nihad.

Military career 
Raguf Orujov gained the necessary military knowledge within two years at the Baku High Infantry Commanders School. After completing his education at the Baku High Infantry Commanders School in 1996, he was later assigned to one of the military units in Baku, but a young officer preferred to be in the front-line. In 1996, he took the assignment to Murovdagh and continued his career as the commander of the intelligence division.

Four-Day War 
The Four-Day April War was his last battle. Lieutenant-colonel Raguf Orujov was one of the commanders of military units with the richest military background.

On the night from 1 to 2 April 2016 a military conflict between the Azerbaijani and Armenian armed forces took place along the line of contact in Nagorno-Karabakh. A ceasefire was reached on 5 April. Lieutenant colonel Raguf Orujov  died on the 2nd of April during 2016 Nagorno-Karabakh clashes.

Awards 
State awards

 The medal "For Distinction in Military Service" (Azerbaijan) 1995;
 For military services medal 1998;
 The 10th Anniversary of the Armed Forces of Azerbaijan 1991-2001 Medal, 2001 
 For Faultless Service medal 2003, 2003
 The 90th Anniversary of the Armed Forces of Azerbaijan 1918-2008 Medal, 2008
 For Faultless Service medal 2nd class, 2008
 The 95th Anniversary of the Armed Forces of Azerbaijan 1918-2013 Medal, 2013
 For Faultless Service medal 1st class, 2013
 For Heroism Medal, 2016

Legacy 

Before the Garabagh - Dudelanj (2: 0) football match, which was held within UEFA Champions League Second qualifying round on July 12, 2016, a banner was opened at the Tofiq Bahramov Republican Stadium on the same day to commemorate Raquf Orujov's 44th anniversary. The banner featured Raguf Orujov's image and the inscription "İmmortal Commandir Raguf Orujov".

A presentation ceremony of the book titled "Eagle of Murov" dedicated to the military activities of Rauf Orujov was held at the Baku Oxford School On February 13, 2017. Most of the prominent figures of Azerbaijan including Ganira Pashayeva, Adil Aliyev, Fuad Muradov, Ilham Zakiyev, Farid Mansurov, Fariz Mammadov, Elmira Süleymanova and others attended the presentation. The book was written based on the memories of fellow soldiers and family members.

Raguf Orujov was buried in the Martyrs' Lane in Sumqayit.

See also 
 2016 Nagorno-Karabakh clashes
 "For heroism" Medal

References 

1972 births
2016 deaths
Azerbaijani military personnel
Azerbaijani military personnel of the Nagorno-Karabakh War
Azerbaijani military personnel killed in action
2016 Nagorno-Karabakh clashes
People from Agdam District
People from Sumgait